Nogometni Klub "Sloga" is a football club from Bosanska Otoka in Bosnia and Herzegovina. The club is currently playing in Druga liga FBiH (Second League of the Federation of Bosnia and Herzegovina).

History

Football clubs in Bosnia and Herzegovina